The Kaiser-Fleetwings A-39 was a project by Kaiser-Fleetwings in the 1942–1943 period for an attack aircraft powered by a single Pratt & Whitney R-2800 radial engine. The A-39 was canceled before any prototypes were built.

Specifications

See also

References

A-39
Single-engined tractor aircraft
Low-wing aircraft
Cancelled military aircraft projects of the United States